The 2014–15 Temple Owls women's basketball team will represent Temple University during the 2014–15 NCAA Division I women's basketball season. The season marks the second for the Owls as members of the American Athletic Conference. The team, coached by head coach Tonya Cardoza in her seventh season, plays their home games at McGonigle Hall with four games at the Liacouras Center. They finished the season 20–17, 12–6 in AAC play to finish in a tie for third place. They lost in the quarterfinals of the American Athletic women's tournament to East Carolina. They were invited to the Women's National Invitation Tournament where they defeated Marist, Penn and NC State in the first, second and third rounds, Middle Tennessee in the quarterfinals before losing to West Virginia in the semifinals.

Media
All Owls home games will have video streaming on Owls TV, ESPN3, or AAC Digital. Road games will typically be streamed on the opponents website, though conference road games could also appear on ESPN3 or AAC Digital. There are no radio broadcasts for Owls women's basketball games. You can listen to audio of most games through the opponents website.

Roster

Schedule and results

|-
!colspan=12 style="background:#DC143C; color:#FFFFFF;"|Regular Season

|-
!colspan=12 style="background:#9D1A33;"| 2015 AAC Tournament

|-
!colspan=12 style="background:#9D1A33;"|WNIT

See also
2014–15 Temple Owls men's basketball team

References

Temple
Temple Owls women's basketball seasons
2015 Women's National Invitation Tournament participants
Temple
Temple